Athletics was contested at the 2017 Summer Universiade from August 23 to 28 at the Taipei Municipal Stadium in Taipei, Taiwan.

Medal summary

Men's events

* Indicates the athlete only competed in the preliminary heats and received medals.

Women's events

* Indicates the athlete only competed in the preliminary heats and received medals.

Medal table

Participating nations

References

External links
2017 Summer Universiade – Athletics 
Result book – Athletics

 
Universiade
Athletics
2017